The Chief Executive of Eritrea was the premier position of the autonomous Eritrea within the Ethiopian Empire. It was first held by Tedla Bairu while its last occupant was Asfaha Woldemikael.

On 20 May 1960 the post was dissolved and replaced by the "Chief Administrator of Eritrea", which was appointed by the Emperor of Ethiopia Haile Selassie I. This in effect dissolved the independent Federal structure and was a prelude to the official, possibly illegal, annexation of Eritrea as a province of Ethiopia on 14 November 1962.

List of Chief Executives of Eritrea (1952–1960)

References

Federation of Ethiopia and Eritrea